Matjaž Brumen (born 1982) is a Slovenian handball player who plays for RD Izola. He was born in Ljubljana. He competed at the 2004 Summer Olympics in Athens, where the Slovenian team placed 11th.

References

External links

1982 births
Living people
Handball players from Ljubljana
Slovenian male handball players
Expatriate handball players
Olympic handball players of Slovenia
Handball players at the 2004 Summer Olympics
21st-century Slovenian people